Renzo Sacco (20 January 1944 – 6 January 2023) was an Italian politician. A member of Lega Nord, he served as president of the Province of Padua from 1995 to 1998.

Sacco died in Padua on 6 January 2023, at the age of 78.

References

1944 births
2023 deaths
20th-century Italian politicians
Lega Nord politicians
Presidents of the Province of Padua
People from the Province of Padua